The 3rd Asian Film Awards was given in a ceremony on 23 March 2009 as part of the Hong Kong International Film Festival.

Nominees and Winners

Best Film
Winner: Tokyo Sonata (Japan)
Forever Enthralled (China)
The Good, the Bad, the Weird (South Korea)
Ponyo on the Cliff by the Sea (Japan)
The Rainbow Troops (Indonesia)
Red Cliff (China)

Best Director
Winner: Koreeda Hirokazu, Still Walking (Japan)
Feng Xiaogang, If You Are the One (China)
Kim Jee-woon, The Good, the Bad, the Weird (South Korea)
Brillante Mendoza, Service (Philippines)
Miyazaki Hayao, Ponyo on the Cliff by the Sea (Japan)
John Woo, Red Cliff (China)

Best Actor
Winner: Masahiro Motoki, Departures (Japan)
Ge You, If You Are the One (China)
Ha Jung-woo, The Chaser (South Korea)
Akshay Kumar, Singh Is Kinng (India)
Kenichi Matsuyama, Detroit Metal City (Japan)
Song Kang-ho, The Good, the Bad, the Weird (South Korea)

Best Actress
Winner: Zhou Xun, The Equation of Love and Death (China)
Fukatsu Eri, The Magic Hour (Japan)
Jiang Wenli, And the Spring Comes (China)
Deepika Padukone, Chandni Chowk To China (India)
Yoshinaga Sayuri, Kabei - Our Mother (Japan)
Zhao Wei, Painted Skin (China/Hong Kong)

Best Newcomer
Winner: Yu Shaoqun, Forever Enthralled (China)
Matsuda Shota, Boys Over Flowers: the Movie (Japan)
Sandrine Pinna, Miao Miao (Taiwan/Hong Kong)
So Ji-sub, Rough Cut (South Korea)
Xu Jiao, CJ7 (Hong Kong)
Yanin Vismistananda, Chocolate (Thailand)

Best Supporting Actor
Winner: Jung Woo-sung, The Good, the Bad, the Weird (South Korea)
Nick Cheung, Beast Stalker (Hong Kong)
Lee Byung-hun, The Good, the Bad, the Weird (South Korea)
Tsutsumi Shinichi, Suspect X (Japan)
Wang Xueqi, Forever Enthralled (China)

Best Supporting Actress
Winner: Gina Pareño, Service (Philippines)
Yū Aoi, Sex Is No Laughing Matter (Japan)
Jaclyn Jose,  Service (Philippines)
Kiki Kirin, Still Walking (Japan)
Kim Ji-young, Forever the Moment (South Korea)

Best Screenwriter
Winner: Kurosawa Kiyoshi, Max Mannix and Sachiko Tanaka, Tokyo Sonata (Japan/Hong Kong/the Netherlands)
Na Hong-jin, The Chaser (South Korea)
Li Qiang, And the Spring Comes (China)
Tom Lin Shu-yu and Henry Tsai, Winds of September (Taiwan/ Hong Kong)
Mitani Koki, The Magic Hour (Japan)

Best Cinematographer
Winner: Jola Dylewska, Tulpan (Germany/Kazakhstan/Poland/Russia/Switzerland)
Ato Shoichi, Paco and the Magical Book (Japan)
Cheng Siu-Keung, Sparrow (Hong Kong)
Lee Mo-gae, The Good, the Bad, the Weird (South Korea)
Wang Yu and Nelson Lik-wai Yu, 24 City (China)

Best Production Designer
Winner: Daniel Yan-kong Lee, Three Kingdoms: Resurrection of the Dragon (China/Hong Kong/South Korea)
Nitin Chandrakant Desai, Jodhaa Akbar (India)
Kuwajima Towako, Paco and the Magical Book (Japan)
Bill Lui, Painted Skin (China/Hong Kong)
Taneda Yohei, The Magic Hour (Japan)

Best Composer
Winner: Joe Hisaishi, Ponyo on the Cliff by the Sea (Japan)
Dalpalan and Jang Young-gyu, The Good, the Bad, the Weird (South Korea)
Hanno Yoshihiro and Lim Giong, 24 City (China)
Henry Wan-man Lai, Three Kingdoms: Resurrection of the Dragon (China/Hong Kong/South Korea)
A.R. Rahman, Jodhaa Akbar (India)

Best Editor
Winner: Kim Sun-min, The Chaser (South Korea)
Chan Ki-hop, Beast Stalker (Hong Kong)
William Suk-ping Chang, Miao Miao (Taiwan/Hong Kong)
Darya Danilova, Native Dancer (Kazakhstan/Russia/France/Cinema of Germany)
Waluyo Ichwandiardono, The Rainbow Troops (Indonesia)

Best Visual Effects
Winner: Craig Hayes, Red Cliff (China)
Kim Wook, The Good, the Bad, the Weird (South Korea)
Yanagawase Masahide, Paco and the Magical Book (Japan)

Special Awards
The Edward Yang New Talent Award:Wei Te-sheng (Taiwan) for Cape No. 7
The Nielsen Box Office Award presented by The Hollywood Reporter: Priyanka Chopra (India)

External links

2009 Asian Film Awards

Asian Film Awards ceremonies
2008 film awards
2009 in Hong Kong
Film
Hong Kong